Thomas Wingett Corbett Jr. (born June 17, 1949) is an American politician and attorney who served as the 46th governor of Pennsylvania from 2011 to 2015. A member of the Republican Party, he served as attorney general of Pennsylvania from 1995 to 1997 and again from 2005 to 2011.

Born in Philadelphia, Corbett is a graduate of Lebanon Valley College and St. Mary's University School of Law and served as a captain in the Pennsylvania Army National Guard. Corbett began his career as an assistant district attorney in Allegheny County, Pennsylvania in 1976. Corbett then joined the U.S. Department of Justice as an assistant U.S. Attorney for the Western District of Pennsylvania, serving from 1980 to 1983, upon entering private practice. In 1988 Corbett was first elected to public office as a Commissioner in the Pittsburgh suburb of Shaler, before serving as the United States Attorney for Western Pennsylvania from 1989 to 1993 in the George H. W. Bush administration.

In 1995, Corbett was appointed to fill the remainder of Ernie Preate's term as Attorney General of Pennsylvania, until 1997. Corbett then reentered private practice and worked as the general counsel for Waste Management, Inc before being elected Attorney General of Pennsylvania in 2004. Corbett was then elected to a second term in 2008, serving a total of two non-consecutive tenures as attorney general from 1995 to 1997, and 2005 to 2011.

Corbett declared his candidacy for governor in March 2009. He won the Republican nomination and defeated Democratic nominee Dan Onorato, with 54.5% of the vote in the 2010 general election. He was sworn into office on January 18, 2011. On November 8, 2013 he announced his intention to run for a second term as the state's chief executive. Corbett lost his bid for a second term to Democrat Tom Wolf in the November 4, 2014 general election. This election marked the first time an incumbent Governor running for re-election in Pennsylvania lost since William Bigler in 1854, and the first time in history that a Republican Governor lost re-election in Pennsylvania.

Early life, education, and early career
Corbett was born in Philadelphia, the son of Mary Bernardine (Diskin) and Thomas W. Corbett. He received his Bachelor's degree at Lebanon Valley College and was employed as a 9th grade teacher for one year at Pine Grove Area School District Corbett then earned his J.D. from St. Mary's University Law School. He served in the Pennsylvania Army National Guard's 28th Infantry Division from 1971 to 1984, rising to the rank of captain.

Corbett's career has been split between private practice and civil service. He began his legal career as an assistant district attorney in Pittsburgh's Allegheny County in 1976. After three and a half years, he was hired in 1980 as an assistant United States Attorney for the Western District of Pennsylvania.

In 1983, Corbett entered private practice as an associate partner at Rose, Schmidt, Hasley & DiSalle. From 1988 and 1989, Corbett won his first election as a township commissioner in the Pittsburgh suburb of Shaler Township.

In 1988, a judge appointed him to monitor the Allegheny County jail while it was under the court's supervision. In 1989, Senators John Heinz and Arlen Specter recommended to President Bush that he nominate Corbett as U.S. Attorney for the Western District of Pennsylvania. Corbett served in the post until May 1993, when he was dismissed by President Bill Clinton.

Corbett then returned to private practice, also serving as an adviser to the gubernatorial campaign of Tom Ridge. Following Ridge's victory, Corbett served on a number of state commissions including the Pennsylvania Commission on Crime and Delinquency, which he served as chairman.

Corbett left office in 1997 and again went into the private sector, first as general counsel for Waste Management, Inc., then opening his own practice.

Attorney General

1995 appointment
In 1995, Corbett was appointed to the position of State Attorney General by Governor Ridge to fill the remainder of the term left by the conviction of Ernie Preate. As a condition of his Senate confirmation, Senate Democrats required him to pledge that he would not run for re-election in 1996. This is a common practice in Pennsylvania for appointments to elected offices. Jerry Pappert made the same pledge in 2003 when he succeeded Mike Fisher as State Attorney General. While Attorney General, Corbett's office received multiple allegations of sexism and derogatory treatment of women. One woman claimed that while working in the office that executives had shared pornographic emails between one another, forcing the office into a $15,000 settlement.

1996 
During one of Corbett's first years as Pennsylvania's Attorney General, in September 1996, Corbett and others granted the Lehigh Carbon Community College and the Cedar Crest EmergiCenter full membership of the Drugs Don't Work Here (DDWH) Program. The DDWH Program is a program that assesses substance abuse in the workplace. Three months later in December, Corbett assured that a used-car dealer in Northampton County to pay violations for state laws, in which the dealer, Matthew Connolly, complied to pay the fines.

2004 election

After early returns were reported, the Associated Press called the race in Democratic nominee Jim Eisenhower's favor, only to retract that call later as the numbers closed. Corbett declared victory the following morning, having defeated Eisenhower by nearly 110,000 votes, winning 50.4% to 48.3%. Green party candidate Marakay Rogers captured 1.3% of the vote.

2008 election

Corbett was re-elected in 2008. He won with the largest vote total of any Republican in the state's history. He defeated Democrat John Morganelli, bucking the trend of Democratic success in Pennsylvania that year.

In October 2008, Corbett prosecuted four individuals who were part of a $9 million meth ring in Berks and Montgomery County.

Healthcare reform

On March 23, 2010, Corbett, along with 13 other state attorneys general, filed a lawsuit against the mandates in the just-signed federal Healthcare Bill, claiming it is unconstitutional. While Corbett personally believed in the federal Healthcare Bill's unconstitutionality, Corbett said he intended to implement the law once he was Governor of Pennsylvania, according to one spokesperson.

Corbett commented, regarding Dwight Evans (Pennsylvania's House Appropriations Committee), that while Evans had the constitutional right to criticize Corbett as attorney general, it would be a matter of statewide concern if Evans were to cut funding due to a legal position taken [by Corbett as Attorney General]. As of January 2011, a total of 27 states have joined this lawsuit.

Jerry Sandusky child sex abuse scandal

Corbett convened a grand jury in 2009 to investigate longstanding allegations of child sexual abuse by former Penn State assistant football coach Jerry Sandusky. The grand jury uncovered evidence of criminal misconduct, and a 40-count indictment against Sandusky was issued in 2011, ultimately leading to Sandusky's criminal conviction in 2012. Corbett has been criticized for the three year time span between the grand jury investigation and Sandusky's indictment, and for his gubernatorial staff approving a $3 million grant to Sandusky's Second Mile charity for children, which, according to the grand jury findings, served as a repository for potential sex-abuse victims.

Twitter 
In 2010, Corbett subpoenaed the social media app, Twitter, in order to "testify and give evidence regarding alleged violations of the laws of Pennsylvania". Corbett ordered Twitter to give information about two Twitter accounts that had been anonymously criticizing him. One of them was responsible for "exposing the hypocrisy of Tom Corbett". Had Twitter failed to appear in court with the information regarding the accounts, Corbett would hold the company accountable and also issue an arrest warrant for the Twitter representative for contempt of court.

Governor of Pennsylvania

2010 election

On March 17, 2009, it was reported that Corbett had formed an exploratory committee and had begun filing the paperwork necessary to begin a run for Governor of Pennsylvania. On September 15, 2009, Corbett formally declared his candidacy. He faced State Representative Sam Rohrer in the May 18, 2010, Republican primary and defeated him with nearly 70% of the vote. In the general election, he faced Allegheny County Chief Executive Dan Onorato, who won the Democratic primary with 45% of the vote.

In May 2010 Corbett filed a criminal subpoena against Twitter ordering them to divulge "any and all subscriber information" of the person(s) behind two accounts that were criticizing the Republican candidate. Corbett's office denied that the subpoenas were related to the criticism, but rather to an ongoing grand jury investigation. Corbett's office ultimately withdrew the subpoenas.

In July 2010, Corbett garnered attention for suggesting that some of the unemployed are exploiting the extension of unemployment benefits prior to seeking employment, and later noted the prevalence of "help wanted" ads in the newspapers as evidence of the availability of employment.

In September 2010, at the first gubernatorial debate, Corbett again gained attention for seemingly violating his "no-tax pledge" in suggesting that he would consider raising the payroll contribution tax.

On November 2, 2010, Corbett was elected Governor of Pennsylvania, defeating Onorato by 2,172,763 votes (54.5%) to 1,814,788 (45.5%). Corbett assumed the office of governor on January 18, 2011, succeeding term-limited Democrat Ed Rendell.

Tenure

Job creation
According to data from the federal Bureau of Labor Statistics, between January 2011, when Corbett took office, and June 2014, Pennsylvania gained a net 124,800 jobs during that period. This ranked Pennsylvania 47th in the nation for job creation – ahead of only New Mexico (1 percent), Alaska (1.58 percent) and Arkansas (1.91 percent). Economist Tara Sinclair noted that Pennsylvania suffered fewer job losses during the recession from 2008–2010, so it might be expected to experience a "less robust recovery". In addition, government employment in the state declined 7% during Corbett's term.

Corbett helped ensure that the three petroleum refineries in Southeastern Pennsylvania would stay open.

Liquor store privatization
On January 30, 2013, Corbett unveiled his plan to privatize Pennsylvania's state-run wine and spirits stores. Corbett estimated the sale of retail and wholesale licenses would raise an estimated $800 million to $1 billion. His administration pledged to use this money for an educational block grant used toward school safety, enhanced early education programs, individualized learning and science, technology, engineering and mathematics courses and programs.

Public opinion
Polling reflected that most Pennsylvanians disapproved of Governor Corbett's job performance, including his decision to privatize the Pennsylvania Lottery, but supported Corbett's desire to sell off state owned liquor stores and fix Pennsylvania's ailing transportation system. Governor Corbett and his wife were criticized for accepting gifts as reported in the Philadelphia Daily News. Some politicians have claimed that the Governor violated the code of conduct of his office. Franklin & Marshall College conducts polling across Pennsylvania and commented on the fact that Corbett was the least-popular Governor in their poll's 18-year history. Their August 2013 poll found that only 17% of voters thought Corbett was doing an "excellent" or "good" job, only 20% thought he deserved to be re-elected and 62% said the state was "off on the wrong track". In November 2013, Public Policy Polling announced that Corbett was the most unpopular Governor in the country, with 65% of registered voters and 51% of registered Republicans disapproving of his job performance.

Budget
Corbett became governor on January 18, 2011. One of his first actions was the proposal of a new state budget that would decrease spending by 3%. The proposed budget received significant criticism due to its cuts in state-supported higher education by 50%. Under the new budget, funding granted to the 14 universities of the Pennsylvania State System of Higher Education and state-related universities Penn State, Pittsburgh, Temple, and Lincoln would be cut in half, totaling $625 million. Corbett has said, however, that he will not attempt to limit collective bargaining, as have Republican Governors John Kasich of Ohio and Scott Walker of Wisconsin.

Corbett's 2013–14 budget included a $90 million increase to basic education, as well as increases to programs that help people with mental and physical disabilities.

Natural gas

Corbett maintained that Pennsylvania should not institute a natural gas extraction tax, due to its already high corporate net income tax. In February 2011, Corbett repealed a four-month-old policy regulating natural gas drilling (including hydraulic fracturing) in park land, deeming it "unnecessary and redundant" according to a spokesperson. The Pennsylvania Democratic Party called the repeal a "payoff" to oil and gas interests which donated a million dollars to Corbett's campaign. According to Corbett, "had they not given me a dime, I would still be in this position, saying we need to grow jobs in Pennsylvania".

On February 17, 2012, Corbett signed The Marcellus Shale Law (House Bill 1950). The law subjected natural gas drillers to an impact fee to offset any environmental or community impacts of drilling. In 2012, the law generated over $200 million for Pennsylvania municipalities, much less than the estimated amount of an extraction tax. The law also changed the zoning laws applicable to Marcellus Shale well drilling, more commonly known as hydraulic fracturing. Some provisions are that all municipalities must allow Marcellus Shale well drilling in all zoning districts, including residential and municipalities may not limit hours of operation. Water and wastewater pits must also be allowed in all zoning districts, including residential. Compressor stations must be allowed in industrial and agricultural zoning districts and towns may not limit hours of operation. Gas processing plants are allowed in industrial zoning districts and hours of operation cannot be limited. Gas pipelines must be allowed in all zoning districts, including residential. The law helped gain access to land for new pipelines, one of which transports natural gas from Pennsylvania to export terminals in Maryland, from which it will be shipped to Europe and Asia. Others contend that the pipeline's purpose is to transport the gas to Maryland and D.C. markets. There were concerns that exporting natural gas will result in more jobs going overseas, leading to increased unemployment in Pennsylvania and other states as gas prices rise globally.

The Marcellus Shale Law (House Bill 1950) also contained a provision that allows doctors in Pennsylvania access to the list of chemicals in hydraulic fracturing fluid in emergency situations only, but forbids them from discussing this information with their patients. The information can only be used for emergency medical treatment, and the doctor must immediately verbally agree to keep the information confidential and later sign a document to that effect. The bill also reduced the legal responsibility of vendors, service providers, and operators regarding the identity and impact of contents of the hydraulic fracturing fluid they use.

Gay marriage/incest remark
In an interview broadcast on October 4, 2013, Corbett was on WHP-TV in Harrisburg when an anchor asked a question regarding a member of his staff comparing the union of gay couples to that of 12-year-old children. Corbett replied: "It was an inappropriate analogy, you know." "I think a much better analogy would have been brother and sister, don't you?" Later Friday, Corbett issued a statement saying his "words were not intended to offend anyone" and apologizing if they did. His office said the interview was taped Monday. "I explained that current Pennsylvania statute delineates categories of individuals unable to obtain a marriage license," he said. "As an example, I cited siblings as one such category, which is clearly defined in state law. My intent was to provide an example of these categories." He said the legal status of same-sex marriage will be decided with "respect and compassion shown to all sides." A federal judge struck down Pennsylvania's ban on same-sex marriage on May 20, 2014.

Cannabis

Corbett is against both the decriminalization of cannabis for recreational use and the legalization of medical cannabis. He believes cannabis to be a "gateway drug that creates all of the drug problems we see in the United States."

2014 election

Corbett formally announced his candidacy for reelection on November 8, 2013.

Corbett was considered vulnerable, as reflected in his low approval ratings. An August 2013 Franklin & Marshall College poll found that only 17% of voters thought Corbett was doing an "excellent" or "good" job, only 20% thought he deserved to be reelected, and 62% said the state was "off on the wrong track". Politico called Corbett the most vulnerable incumbent governor in the United States, The Washington Post ranked the election as the most likely for a party switch, and the majority of election forecasters rated it "likely Democratic".

Despite Corbett's unpopularity and speculation that he would face a primary challenge, he was unopposed in the Republican primary. Attorney and conservative activist Bob Guzzardi announced a run against Corbett, however the state Supreme Court ordered Guzzardi's name struck from the ballot due to his failure to file a statement of financial interest, leaving Corbett unopposed for the Republican nomination.

In the general election, Corbett faced Democratic nominee Tom Wolf, a businessman and former Secretary of the Pennsylvania Department of Revenue. Polling indicated a very difficult path to reelection for Corbett; he had trailed Wolf in every single poll taken since March 2013. RealClearPolitics reported an average lead of 10.8% for Wolf. HuffPost Pollster's model estimated that Corbett would lose to Wolf 54.2% to 36.8% and reported that the probability of Wolf beating Corbett was 99%.

On November 4, 2014, Corbett lost to Democratic nominee Tom Wolf in the general election. He received 45.1% of the vote while Wolf won 54.9%. After his term expired on January 20, 2015, Corbett returned to private life.

Under the 1968 constitution, he is the first incumbent governor to lose bid for re-election. Out of 19 Republican governors, Corbett and Alaska's Sean Parnell were the only governors who lost their positions during the 2014 election cycle.

Personal life

Corbett married Susan Manbeck Corbett in 1972. The couple met as students at Lebanon Valley College in Annville. Mrs. Corbett has worked as a teacher and a legal secretary. Lately, her career has been in arts administration: as special projects manager for the President's Office at Carnegie Museums and the Director's Office of Carnegie Library of Pittsburgh. She served as Assistant Producer and then Executive Director of Pittsburgh Arts and Lectures and Vice-President for Programs and Development for the Gettysburg Foundation.

Corbett and his wife, Susan, have two children, Tom and Katherine.

Electoral history

Notes

References

External links
Tom Corbett Biography at the Pennsylvania Historical & Museum Commission
Tom Corbett 2014 campaign site

|-

|-

|-

|-

|-

|-

1949 births
Republican Party governors of Pennsylvania
Lebanon Valley College alumni
Living people
Pennsylvania Attorneys General
Pennsylvania lawyers
Pennsylvania National Guard personnel
People from Shaler Township, Pennsylvania
Politicians from Philadelphia
St. Mary's University School of Law alumni
United States Attorneys for the Western District of Pennsylvania